Square Moore (July 6, 1900 - June 27, 1960) was an American baseball pitcher in the Negro leagues. He played from 1923 to 1933 with several teams.

References

External links
 and Baseball-Reference Black Baseball stats and Seamheads

1900 births
Bacharach Giants players
Birmingham Black Barons players
Cleveland Hornets players
Cleveland Tigers (baseball) players
Cleveland Elites players
Indianapolis ABCs players
Memphis Red Sox players
Baseball players from Arkansas
1960 deaths
Baseball pitchers